Laura Hartley (born 31 January 2001) is an English professional footballer who plays as a goalkeeper for Lewes. She joined the FA Women's Championship club from Brighton & Hove Albion of the FA WSL, initially on loan.

Club career 
Hartley's professional debut was in April 2018 against London Bees. Hartley played in Brighton's first ever FA WSL game in September 2018, in a 1–0 loss, after Marie Hourihan and Sophie Harris were both injured. Hartley was then selected for the club's pre-season training camp in Spain in preparation for the 2019–20 season.

She signed for Lewes in August 2020, having already made one appearance while at the club on loan the previous season.

Career statistics

References

External links 
 Brighton Profile
 
Laura Hartley at Instagram 
Laura Hartley at World football

2001 births
Living people
English women's footballers
Women's association football goalkeepers
Women's Super League players
Brighton & Hove Albion W.F.C. players
Lewes F.C. players
Women's Championship (England) players